Giulietta may refer to:

Giulietta Masina – Italian actress.
Alfa Romeo Giulietta – Alfa Romeo's various anniversary cars.
Giulietta (singer) - Australian pop singer.

See also
Romeo and Juliet (disambiguation)
Juliette (disambiguation)
Juliet (disambiguation)

Italian feminine given names